Canterbury Museum may refer to:
Beaney House of Art and Knowledge, Canterbury, England
Canterbury Heritage Museum, Canterbury, England
Canterbury Museum, Christchurch, New Zealand